Geir Ove Berg (born 13 March 1947) is a Norwegian former ski jumper.

Career
On 4 March 1976, he set at the ski jumping world record distance at 173 metres (568 ft) on Heini-Klopfer-Skiflugschanze in Oberstdorf, West Germany.

Ski jumping world record

Notes

References

External links
 Arne Thoresen: Lengst gjennom lufta. Versal Forlag, Oslo 2007. , s. 183-184, 187
 Skisprungschanzen-Archiv: Flying hills (med liste over verdensrekorder)

1947 births
Living people
Norwegian male ski jumpers
People from Furnes, Norway
Sportspeople from Innlandet
20th-century Norwegian people